Shanti Gopal Sen  (  25 December 1913 – 16 September 1996 ) was an Indian revolutionary and member of the Bengal Volunteers who carried out assassinations against British colonial officials in an attempt to secure Indian independence.

Early life and education 
Santi Gopal Sen was born in Malda in the year 1913. After passing the matriculation examination from Malda Zilla School he was admitted to Midnapur College for further studies. Later he joined the Bengal Volunteers, a revolutionary organisation of British India.thumb|Shanti Gopal Sen's name in Andaman Cellular Jail list, Port Blair 2009

Revolutionary activities 
After the murder of Magistrate Paddy and Robert Douglas no British officer was ready to take the charge of Midnapore District. Mr. Bernard E J Burge, a ruthless District Magistrate was posted in Midnapore district. The members of the Bengal volunteers i.e. Naba Jiban Ghosh, Ramkrishna Roy, Brajakishore Chakraborty, Prabhanshu Sekhar Pal, Kamakhya Charan Ghosh, Sonatan Roy, Nanda Dulal Singh, Sukumar Sen Gupta, Bijoy Krishna Ghose, Purnananda Sanyal, Manindra Nath Choudhury, Saroj Ranjan Das Kanungo, Santi Gopal Sen, Sailesh Chandra Ghose, Anath Bondhu Panja and Mrigendra Dutta etc decided to assassinate him. Panja along with Ramkrishna Roy, Brajakishore Chakraborty, Nirmal Jiban Ghosh and Mrigen Dutt planned to shot him dead while Burge was about to take part of a football match ( Bradley-Birt football tournament) named by Francis Bradley Bradley-Birt at the police grounds of Midnapore. Actually  the magistrate was a member of both Calcutta football Club and Calcutta cricket Club present time Calcutta Cricket and Football Club. Burge, during the half time of the football match in Police parade ground was killed when he was stepping from a car to take part of the football match on 2 September 1933 by them. Anathbandhu was killed instantly by the body guard of the DM and Mrigen Dutta died in the hospital on the next day. Anathbandhu Panja, Mrigen Dutta and the other persons were acquitted on murder charge of the district magistrate of Midnapore, Special Tribunal under B.C.L.A. Act, 1925 found that Bijoy Krishna Ghose, Purnanandu Sanyal, Manindra Nath Choudhury and Saroj Ranjan Das Kanungo were not guilty of the offence charged against them. The other persons namely Nirmal Jiban Ghosh, Brojokishore Chakravarty and Ram Krishna Roy found guilty and sentenced to death. Santi Gopal Sen with other rest of the accused, namely, Kamakhya Charan Ghosh, Sonatan Roy, Nanda Dulal Singh, Sukumar Sen Gupta, Prabhanshu Sekhar Pal, Sailesh Chandra Ghose were found guilty and were sent to Jail.

Later life 
After independence of India, Sen won several elections, which included the Englishbazar seat of West Bengal Assembly in 1957, 1962, and 1967. All time he was the winner of the Assembly poll as a Congress candidate. For the rest of his life he worked as a social worker. He was honoured with a tamra patra by the Indian Government in 1972. He helps and donates in various way for the establishment of Malda Women's College and Malda Girls School (Shanti Sen Girls School)  He died on 16 September 1996.

References

1913 births
1996 deaths
Revolutionary movement for Indian independence
Indian nationalism
Indian people convicted of murder
Indian revolutionaries
People from Malda district
Revolutionaries from West Bengal
Bengali politicians
West Bengal MLAs 1957–1962
West Bengal MLAs 1962–1967
West Bengal MLAs 1967–1969
Indian independence activists from West Bengal